Cyclostremellini is a minor tribe, a taxonomic grouping, of minute sea snails, marine gastropod mollusks or micromollusks, in the family Pyramidellidae, the pyrams and their allies.

Taxonomy 
Cyclostremellinae has been a subfamily one of eleven recognised in the Pyramidellidae (according to the taxonomy of Ponder & Lindberg, 1997), and according to Schander, van Aartsen and Corgan (1999) it comprises two genera, Cyclostremella and Pseudoskenella.

In the taxonomy of Bouchet & Rocroi (2005), this subfamily has been downgraded to the rank of tribe Cyclostremellini in the subfamily Odostomiinae.

Genera
Genera within the tribe Cyclostremellini include:
 Cyclostremella Bush, 1897
 Cyclostremella californica Bartsch, 1907
 Cyclostremella concordia  Bartsch, 1920
 Cyclostremella conradia  Bartsch, 1920
 Cyclostremella humilis Bartsch, 1897
 Pseudoskenella Ponder, 1973
 Pseudoskenella depressa Ponder, 1973

References

External links 
 
OBIS Indo-Pacific Molluscan Database

Pyramidellidae